Petite Suite may refer to the following musical compositions:
Petite Suite (Bartók)
Petite Suite (Borodin)
Petite Suite (Debussy)